Reta may refer to:

Reta language, Papuan language
Athyma reta (butterfly)

People

Given name
Reta Beebe (born 1936), American astronomer, author and popularizer of astronomy
Reta Cowley (1910–2004), Canadian painter
Reta Jo Lewis (born 1953), American Director of Congressional Affairs, an attorney, diplomat
Reta Mays (born 1975), American serial killer 
Reta Shaw (1912–1982), American character actress 
Reta Trotman (born 1989), New Zealand racing cyclist

Surname
Adela Reta (1921-2001), Uruguayan lawyer and jurist
Runa Reta (born 1980), Canadian squash player

See also
Retta (disambiguation)